Osbertia is a genus of Mesoamerican flowering plants in the family Asteraceae.

 Species
 Osbertia bartlettii (S.F.Blake) G.L.Nesom - 	Nuevo León, Tamaulipas
 Osbertia chihuahuana B.L.Turner & S.D.Sundb. - Chihuahua
 Osbertia heleniastrum (Greene) Greene - State of México
 Osbertia stolonifera (DC.) Greene - 	Chiapas, Oaxaca, Guatemala

References

Asteraceae genera
Flora of North America
Astereae